Mott is an extinct town in southern Howell County, in the Ozarks of southern Missouri. The community was located on Missouri Route 17, approximately ten miles south of West Plains.

A post office called Mott was established in 1892, and remained in operation until 1911. The community was named after Martha "Aunt Mott" Briscoe, a local educator.

References

Ghost towns in Missouri
Former populated places in Howell County, Missouri